The Renault Étoile Filante (Shooting Star) was Renault's only attempt at both creating a gas turbine-powered car and setting a land speed record for such cars.

In 1954 the French aeronautical turbine's manufacturer, Turbomeca, proposed that Renault make a gas turbine car, both to exalt the benefits of the technology and to try to break the speed record for gas turbine cars.

Renault created the car, and tested it in a wind tunnel between 1954 and 1955. In 1956, Jean Hébert and a Renault Team went off to the Bonneville Salt Flats in Utah for speed tests. These speed tests also helped promote sales from Renault's newest car in the United States, the Dauphine. The Étoile Filante later appeared at motor shows all over the world. In the early 1960s, however, the end of the gas-turbine era stopped Renault from making a second car, and its speed record was neglected.

In the mid 1990s, Renault decided to restore the car, with a view to getting it running again. Renault completely dismantled the car at its Billancourt factory in Paris, respraying the chassis and repairing the engine. In front of an expectant crowd, the car was fired up and moved under its own power for the first time since 1956.  It's now conserved as a part of Renault's Historical Cars Collection.

Return to Bonneville
In 2016, to celebrate the 60th anniversary of the Étoile Filante's 1956 record run, the car was fitted with an electric motor and brought back to the Bonneville Salt Flats with Nicolas Prost, son of Alain Prost, at the wheel. It did not compete for a record.

See also
 Chrysler Turbine Car
 Fiat Turbina
 General Motors Firebird
 Rover-BRM
 Toyota GTV

References 

 

Etoile Filante
1950s cars
Etoile Filante
Gas turbine land speed record cars